The National Junior Hockey League (NMHL) (formerly Junior Hockey League Division B) is the second level of the Junior Hockey League, the KHL's junior ice hockey league. The B division was established in 2011 and the inaugural season was the 2011–12 season. A promotion and relegation system was in place between the MHL and MHL-B, where the bottom 2 teams at the end of the season of MHL were relegated to MHL-B and the 2 best MHL-B teams are promoted to MHL.

The Regions Cup is awarded to the champion of the playoffs of the league.

Generation Cup

The Generation Cup is the all-star game of MHL-B and analog to the MHL's Challenge Cup. The first ever Generation Cup took place on 23 February 2012 in Penza and featured Team East against Team West.

Editions

Future Cup
The Future Cup was an exhibition game featuring under-18 players of MHL and MHL-B. The first ever (and so far only)  Future Cup took place on 13 March 2012 in Chelyabinsk and featured players who were not born before 1 January 1994.

Editions

Super Cup
The Super Cup was the trophy awarded to the winner of the game between the winner of the Kharlamov Cup (the MHL champions) and the winner of the Regions Cup (the MHL-B champions). The first ever (and so far only) Super Cup took place on 30 April 2016 in Uchaly.

Editions

2012 expansion
Seven new teams were confirmed for the 2012–13 season: MHC Dmitrov, Zauralie Kurgan, HC Ryazan, Buran Voronezh, HC Belgorod, Sputnik Nizhny Tagil and Platina Chișinău from Moldova.

Teams in 2018–19

Champions

 [*]: Both losing semifinalists received bronze medals

References

External links
 NMHL Official Website

6
Junior ice hockey in Russia